Shadow squadrons are additional squadron numbers allocated to Royal Air Force training, Operational conversion, and Operational and Weapons evaluation units. Normally in peacetime these units are not tasked with combat roles, however UK planning for a major confrontation during the Cold War would have seen the tasking of the aircraft and pilots of these units in combat roles with the activation of the shadow designations.

Shadow squadron activation would have seen for example the RAF's BAE Systems Hawk trainers flown by flight instructors and pilots from the Red Arrows in the point air defence role with guns and AIM-9 Sidewinder missiles.

With defence cuts and the disbanding of historic squadrons the "double number plating" of squadrons was a means of preserving the histories and lineages of such squadrons against the day that they could be revived.

See also 
 Operation Banquet for the Second World War equivalent plan

References

Squadrons of the Royal Air Force